Óskar Jakobsson (born 29 January 1955) is an Icelandic athlete. He competed at the 1976 Summer Olympics and the 1980 Summer Olympics.

References

1955 births
Living people
Athletes (track and field) at the 1976 Summer Olympics
Athletes (track and field) at the 1980 Summer Olympics
Oskar Jakobsson
Oskar Jakobsson
Oskar Jakobsson
Oskar Jakobsson
Place of birth missing (living people)